Rodrigo de Ávila (died February 1492) was a Roman Catholic prelate who served as Bishop of Plasencia (1470–1492).

Biography
On 29 January 1470, Rodrigo de Ávila was appointed during the papacy of Pope Paul II as Bishop of Plasencia. He served as Bishop of Plasencia until his death in February 1492.

See also
Catholic Church in Spain

References

External links and additional sources
 (for Chronology of Bishops)  
 (for Chronology of Bishops) 

15th-century Roman Catholic bishops in Castile
Bishops appointed by Pope Paul II
1492 deaths